One use of the concept of biocontainment is related to laboratory biosafety and pertains to microbiology laboratories in which the physical containment of pathogenic organisms or agents (bacteria, viruses, and toxins) is required, usually by isolation in environmentally and biologically secure cabinets or rooms, to prevent accidental infection of workers or release into the surrounding community during scientific research.

Another use of the term relates to facilities for the study of agricultural pathogens, where it is used similarly to the term "biosafety", relating to safety practices and procedures used to prevent unintended infection of plants or animals or the release of high-consequence pathogenic agents into the environment (air, soil, or water).

Terminology
The World Health Organization's 2006 publication, Biorisk management: Laboratory biosecurity guidance, defines laboratory biosafety as "the containment principles, technologies and practices that are implemented to prevent the unintentional exposure to pathogens and toxins, or their accidental release". It defines biorisk management as "the analysis of ways and development of strategies to minimize the likelihood of the occurrence of biorisks".

The term "biocontainment" is related to laboratory biosafety. Merriam-Webster's online dictionary reports the first use of the term in 1966, defined as "the containment of extremely pathogenic organisms (such as viruses) usually by isolation in secure facilities to prevent their accidental release especially during research".

The term laboratory biosafety refers to the measures taken "to reduce the risk of accidental release of or exposure to infectious disease agents", whereas laboratory biosecurity is usually taken to mean "a set of systems and practices employed in legitimate bioscience facilities to reduce the risk that dangerous biological agents will be stolen and used maliciously".

Containment types

Laboratory context 
Primary containment is the first container in direct contact with biohazardous material as well as protection of personnel and the immediate laboratory environment from exposure to infectious agents. Primary containment requires using proper storage containers, good microbiological technique, and the use of appropriate safety equipment such as biological safety cabinets.

Secondary containment is the protection of the environment external to the laboratory from exposure to infectious materials and is provided by a combination of facility design and operational practices.

Biological safety cabinets (BSC), first commercially available in 1950, are fairly common devices designed to provide effective primary biocontainment in laboratories working with highly infectious agents. Three general levels and types have been devised (Class I, Class II, and Class III).

Biosafety suites are suites of laboratory rooms which are essentially equivalent to large Class III cabinets in which positive pressure personnel suits ("space suits") serve as the "outside" environment for workers. Examples include the biosafety suites at USAMRIID at Fort Detrick, Maryland, USA and the Maximum Containment Facility (MCF) of the CDC in Atlanta, Georgia, USA.

Agricultural context 

The term “biocontainment” is used differently in facilities for the study of human pathogens versus those used for the study of agricultural pathogens. In agricultural facilities, the definition for “biocontainment” resembles that for “biosafety,” i.e., the safety practices and procedures used to prevent unintended infection of plants or animals or the release of high-consequence pathogenic agents into the environment (air, soil, or water). In the agricultural setting, worker protection and public health are always considerations; however, emphasis is placed on reducing the risk that agents under study could escape into the environment.

Biosafety levels

A "biosafety level" (BSL) is the level of the biocontainment precautions required to isolate dangerous biological agents in an enclosed laboratory facility. The levels of containment range from the lowest biosafety level 1 (BSL-1) to the highest at level 4 (BSL-4). In the United States, the Centers for Disease Control and Prevention (CDC) have specified these levels. In the European Union, the same biosafety levels are defined in a directive.

Guidelines

Today, guiding publications for biosafety and containment in the US are set by the Centers for Disease Control and Prevention (CDC) and the National Institutes of Health (NIH). Since 1984, the CDC and the NIH have jointly authored the Biosafety in Microbiological and Medical Laboratories (BMBL)  and the separately-published section of the BMBL, Appendix A: "Primary Containment for Biohazards: Selection, Installation, and Use of Biosafety Cabinets". The BMBL sets national regulations for Biosafety Levels, Containment, Decontamination and Disinfection, Transportation, and Disposal of biohazardous agents.

OECD Best Practice Guidelines for Biological Resource Centres is a consensus report created  in 2001 after experts from OECD countries came together, calling upon "national governments to undertake actions to bring the BRC concept into being in concert with the international scientific community". BRCs are "repositories and providers of high-quality biological materials and information".

Laboratory program
Components of a laboratory biosecurity program include:
 Physical security
 Personnel security
 Material control and accountability
 Transport security
 Information security
 Program management

See also

References
Citations

Other sources
Biosafety in Microbiological and Biomedical Laboratories (1999), 4th Edition, U.S. Department of Health and Human Services, Public Health Service, Centers for Disease Control and Prevention, National Institutes of Health, Washington, DC: U.S. Government Printing Office. 
 The 2013 International Conference on Biocontainment Facilities
 The 2014 International Conference on Biocontainment Facilities
 eBook Reference: Management Principles for Building and Operating Biocontainment Facilities (Kindle Edition) 
Wedum, A.G., W.E. Barkley, and A. Hellman (1972), "Handling of infectious agents", Journal of the American Veterinary Medical Association, 161(11):1557-1567.

Further reading

 Biorisk Management: Laboratory Biosecurity Guidance. WHO, 2006
  Biosafety in Microbiological and Biomedical Laboratories, 5th edition, 2007 (CDC)

 (Website here)

 PDF
 Laboratory Biosafety Manual, 3rd edition, 2004 (4th edition slideshow and draft - Section 8 on Laboratory Biosecurity)
 

Safety
Biological contamination
Biological hazards